Zhao Hongbo (born 22 September 1973) is a Chinese retired pair skater. With his wife Shen Xue, Zhao is the 2010 Olympic champion, the 2002 & 2006 Olympic bronze medalist, a three-time World champion (2002, 2003 & 2007), a three-time Four Continents Champion (1999, 2003 & 2007) and a six-time Grand Prix Final champion (1998, 1999, 2003, 2004, 2006 & 2009).

Shen and Zhao were the first Chinese pair team to win a medal at an International Skating Union event and at the World Figure Skating Championships. In 2002, they became the first Chinese pair skating team to win a World Championship. They are also the first Chinese pair skaters to win a medal at the Winter Olympic Games. In 2010, they were the first Chinese skaters to win the gold medal at the Winter Olympic Games in any figure skating category, ending almost half a century of Russian and Soviet pair skating dominance.

Personal life
Zhao was born in Harbin, Heilongjiang and is of Manchurian ethnicity. Shen and Zhao announced their engagement after the 2007 World Figure Skating Championships. They were married shortly after.

Shen and Zhao are the parents of a daughter, born 3 September 2013.

They currently live and coach in Shenzhen, Guangdong.

Career

Early career and development 
Early in his career, Zhao skated with partner Xie Maomao. They placed 11th at the 1991 World Junior Figure Skating Championships.

He began skating with Shen Xue in 1992, under the tutelage of Yao Bin. They competed at their first Olympics in 1998, in Nagano, Japan and finished fifth. They went on to the 1999 World Figure Skating Championships a year later with improved choreography and expression, and won the silver medal, becoming the first Chinese team to ever win a World Championship medal.

International Success 
Shen and Zhao improved each year, and were considered to be one of the top teams in the world. They won another silver medal at the Worlds in 2000, and a bronze in 2001. They were considered strong medal contenders in the 2002 Winter Olympics. They won the bronze with a strong performance, missing a throw quadruple salchow attempt. They became the first Chinese pair to win a medal at the Olympics for figure skating.

World Champions
At the 2002 World Figure Skating Championships held in Nagano, Japan, Shen and Zhao won their first World Championship, becoming the first Chinese pair skaters to win a gold medal in the history of figure skating. Later in March 2003, as the defending world champions, the team also won their second World Championship in Washington D.C., United States. While practising their throw quadruple salchow, Shen landed badly and severely injured her landing foot and ankle. She required several treatments to numb the foot entirely so that she should compete. The pair performed a brilliant long program that earned them several perfect 6.0's for both technical merits and presentation.

In the 2003–2004 season, competing for the first time under the Code of Points, they placed second at the 2003 Skate Canada and won the 2003 Cup of China. They won their third Grand Prix Final gold medal at the 2003–2004 Grand prix Final, where they won both the short program with 66.00 points and the free skate with 130.08. The team earned a total of 196.08 points to finish 18.78 points ahead of their new rivals Tatiana Totmianina & Maxim Marinin of Russia, who were second in both the short and the long program.
 
Their attempt to win a third straight World title in 2004 was thwarted when Zhao fell during their short program and the team placed fourth in that segment. They rebounded to win the free program with a string of 6.0s, but it was only good enough for second overall behind Tatiana Totmianina & Maxim Marinin.

Injury and 2006 Olympics
Shen and Zhao won gold medals at the 2004 Skate Canada, at the 2004 Trophée Eric Bompard and at the 2004 Cup of China. Following their wins at all their Grand Prix events, they also won the 2004–2005 Grand Prix Final in Beijing, China, placing first in the short program with 70.52 points and in the free skate scoring 136.02. Overall they won the gold medal earning a total of 206.54 points, 19.22 ahead of Maria Petrova & Alexei Tikhonov, who placed second in both segments of the competition. As a result, they set a new world record for the short program, for the free skate and for the combined total score under the ISU Judging System.

In 2005 Zhao's Achilles tendon injury forced them to withdraw from the World Championships, and weeks later, he ruptured the tendon during practice. They missed the entire competitive season and were unable to return to the ice until weeks before the 2006 Winter Olympics in Turin, Italy. They placed fifth in the short program with 62.32 points and third in the free skate with 124.59. Their lack of adequate preparation was obvious, but they managed to win a second Olympic bronze medal earning 186.91 points, 17.57 points behind Tatiana Totmianina & Maxim Marinin, who won the gold medal.

Third World title and retirement
The 2006–2007 proved to be a very strong season for the pair. They began winning the 2006 Cup of China, where they came in first place in the short program and in the free skate to win the competition with a total score of 193.59 points, 21.03 ahead of Zhang Dan & Zhang Hao. They also won the 2006 NHK Trophy, where they also placed first in both the short program and the free skate earning 190.97 points, beating Pang Qing & Tong Jian by 8.13.

They earned the gold medal at the 2006–2007 Grand Prix Final, held in Saint Petersburg, Russia. At that competition, they won the short program scoring 68.66 points, 4.48 points ahead of Zhang Dan & Zhang Hao. The team also placed first in the free skate with 134.53 points, 12.68 ahead of Aliona Savchenko & Robin Szolkowy from Germany. They earned a total of 203.19 points to finish 22.52 points ahead of second-place finishers Aliona Savchenko & Robin Szolkowy.

At the 2007 Asian Winter Games, where they won the short program with 69.49 points, leading by 3.84 over the rest of the field. They placed first in free skate scoring 126.06 points, winning that segment as well by 10.24 points. They earned 195.55 points overall, edging their teammates Pang Qing & Tong Jian by 14.08 points, who placed second in both the short program and the free skate.

Some weeks later, they won the 2007 Four Continents Championships, placing first in the short program with 69.29 points, 3.49 ahead of the rest of the competitors. They also won the free skate earning 133.76 points, leading that segment of the competition by 14.23 points. As a result, they scored a combined total of 203.05 points to win the competition 17.72 points ahead of Pang Qing & Tong Jian, who again came in second place in the short and in the long program.

They also won the 2007 World Figure Skating Championships in Tokyo, Japan, placing first in the short program with 71.07 points, taking the lead by 3.42 points ahead of Aliona Savchenko & Robin Szolkowy, and setting a new world record under the ISU Judging System. They also won the free skate with 132.43 points, 10.72 ahead of Pang Qing & Tong Jian, who placed second in that segment of the competition. Overall they scored a total 203.50 points and won by a 15.04-point margin of victory over silver medalists Pang Qing & Tong Jian. As a result, on 21 March 2007, they won their third World Championship title. Following the win, they married and announced their retirement from the sport.

Return to competition
They returned to competition in the 2009–2010 season to compete in the 2010 Winter Olympics, and were assigned to 2009 Cup of China and 2009 Skate America in the 2009–2010 ISU Grand Prix series.

At the 2009 Cup of China, they placed first in the short program earning a personal best score of 72.28. They also won the free skate scoring 128.69 to win the competition with 200.97 points, 14.18 points ahead of silver medalists Zhang Dan & Zhang Hao. At the 2009 Skate America, they placed first in the short program with a new personal best of 74.36 points. They also lead in the free skate where they earned 127.04 points. Scoring 201.40 points overall, 29.58 points over Tatiana Volosozhar & Stanislav Morozov, they won the gold medal.

Those two wins directly qualified them for the 2009–2010 Grand Prix Final that was held in Tokyo, Japan, in December 2009. At the event, they lead the short program with a new personal best of 75.36 points, 2.22 points ahead of Aliona Savchenko & Robin Szolkowy, who were second. They also placed first in the free skate with another personal best of 138.89 points, 5.07 ahead of fellow second-place finishers Pang Qing & Tong Jian. They won the gold medal earning 214.25 points overall, edging silver medalists Pang Qing & Tong Jian by 12.39 points and improving their previous combined total score. At the competition, they set new world records for the short program, for the free skating and for the combined total under the ISU Judging System.

2010 Olympics

On 14 February 2010, they competed at the 2010 Winter Olympics. They led the short program with 76.66 points, 0.70 ahead of Aliona Savchenko & Robin Szolkowy. They achieved a new personal best and set a new record score again under the ISU Judging System for the short program.

On 15 February 2010, in the pairs' free skating they came second with a new personal best score of 139.91 points, 1.90 behind Pang Qing & Tong Jian, who claimed the silver medal. Their program components score of 72.40 was the highest of the event. They also got a 10.00 for interpretation from one judge. With an overall total of 216.57 points they finished in first place taking the gold medal, by a 3.26 margin on Pang Qing & Tong Jian and a 5.77 margin on bronze medalists Aliona Savchenko & Robin Szolkowy. Their combined score was also a world record. At 31 and 36 years old respectively, they were among the oldest Olympic champions in figure skating. They became the first Chinese skaters in any figure skating discipline to win a gold medal at the Winter Olympic Games.

China at the event also broke Russia's 46-year twelve-Olympic gold medal streak in pairs figure skating, sweeping gold and silver places.

Final retirement 

On 17 February 2010, they announced their definite retirement from competitive skating to focus on their personal life. They said they would retire from shows in 2012, planning to start a family, promote their sport, and begin coaching.

List of world record scores set by Shen/Zhao

Public life and endorsements
Shen and Zhao's current and past sponsors include Nike, Visa, General Electric and Lenovo.

They have toured in multiple ice shows all around the world, including the 2007 Golden Skate Awards in Turin, Italy, the 2008 & 2010 Stars on Ice in the United States and the 2009 Ice All Stars, this last one held in Seoul, South Korea alongside other world class figure skaters including the 2010 Olympic ladies champion and show headliner Yuna Kim.

They joined Kim in another ice show, the All That Skate. Other skaters like Michelle Kwan and Stéphane Lambiel performed in the show as well.

Coaching career
Zhao now coaches alongside Yao Bin and Bing Han at the Harbin Skating Club. His current students include Wenjing Sui & Cong Han; Peng Cheng & Zhang Hao; Xiaoyu Yu & Yang Jin; Gao Yumeng / Xie Zhong.

Programs

Competitive highlights
(With Shen)

Detailed results

References

External links

Official Website

Pairs on Ice: Xue Shen & Hongbo Zhao

Pairs on Ice: Xie & Zhao
China's Shen and Zhao win pairs gold

1973 births
Living people
Chinese male pair skaters
Figure skaters at the 1998 Winter Olympics
Figure skaters at the 2002 Winter Olympics
Figure skaters at the 2006 Winter Olympics
Figure skaters at the 2010 Winter Olympics
Olympic bronze medalists for China
Olympic figure skaters of China
Olympic gold medalists for China
Figure skaters from Harbin
Olympic medalists in figure skating
World Figure Skating Championships medalists
Four Continents Figure Skating Championships medalists
Medalists at the 2010 Winter Olympics
Medalists at the 2006 Winter Olympics
Medalists at the 2002 Winter Olympics
Asian Games medalists in figure skating
Figure skaters at the 1996 Asian Winter Games
Figure skaters at the 1999 Asian Winter Games
Figure skaters at the 2003 Asian Winter Games
Figure skaters at the 2007 Asian Winter Games
Asian Games gold medalists for China
Medalists at the 1996 Asian Winter Games
Medalists at the 1999 Asian Winter Games
Medalists at the 2003 Asian Winter Games
Medalists at the 2007 Asian Winter Games
Universiade medalists in figure skating
Season-end world number one figure skaters
Manchu sportspeople
Universiade gold medalists for China
Competitors at the 1997 Winter Universiade